Power Rangers Ninja Steel is an American children's television series that airs on Nickelodeon. It is the 2017 entry in the Power Rangers franchise. The show follows Brody Romero (William Shewfelt), Preston Tien (Peter Sudarso), Calvin Maxwell (Nico Greetham), Hayley Foster (Zoe Robins), Sarah Thompson (Chrysti Ane), and "Levi Weston"/Aiden Romero (Jordi Webber) who protect the Earth from Galvanax, a reigning champion from Galaxy Warriors who seeks the Ninja Power Stars to conquer the universe.

Ninja Steel Power Rangers
Based at the schools Automotive Department, Ninja Steel Power Rangers' arsenal revolves around being powered by the Ninja Nexus Prism. In Power Rangers Dino Fury, the Ninja Nexus Prism were created by Morphin Masters. The Rangers transform using Ninja Battle Morpher in conjunction with Ninja Power Stars and each wield a Ninja Star Blade and Ninja Blaster.

Brody Romero
Brody Romero is the exuberant, youthful, positive 18-year-old leader of the Ninja Steel Power Rangers and the son of a ninja master named Dane Romero. Ten years prior to the events of Ninja Steel, 8-year-old Brody was captured by Galvanax after his father mysteriously vanished.

After his capture, Brody was forced to work as a slave for Galvanax. During this time, he bonded with the robotic Redbot and a shape-shifting alien named Mick Kanic while gaining an enemy in his supervisor Ripcon. In the present after overhearing Galvanax's plan to get the Ninja Steel back on Earth, he, Redbot, and Mick take the opportunity to escape with the Ninja Nexus Prism. After being forced to use the ship's trash chute as an escape, he and Redbot became separated from Mick. Upon landing, he was attacked by Korvaka, but was saved by the unexpected arrival of Sarah and Preston. The three of them then pulled out three of the Ninja Power Stars, turning them into Power Rangers, with Brody becoming the Red Ranger and the team's leader.

As the Red Ninja Steel Ranger, Brody commands the Robo Red Zord that resembles Redbot.

Brody Romero is portrayed by William Shewfelt, while Taimana Marupo portrays Young Brody.

Preston Tien
Preston Tien is a kind-hearted teen who is a struggling magician obsessed with magic. He and Sarah go to investigate the object that fell from the sky and save Brody Romero from the alien Korvaka. The three of them then pull out three of the Ninja Power Stars from the Ninja Nexus Prism and become Power Rangers, with Preston becoming the Blue Ranger and the team's second-in-command.
Preston also has a very wealthy businessman father Marcus Tien.

As the Blue Ninja Steel Ranger, Preston commands the Dragon Zord. Uniquely, though, he wields powerful magical abilities.

Preston Tien is portrayed by Peter Sudarso, the brother of the previous Blue Power Ranger's actor Yoshi Sudarso. He also portrayed as Marvin "Marv" Leonard Shih, the Hyperforce Red Ranger in Power Rangers Hyperforce.

Calvin Maxwell
Calvin Maxwell is a teenager who is an expert mechanic. He becomes the Yellow Ninja Steel Ranger upon being saved from Ripperat by the Nexus Prism. He is also Hayley's boyfriend.

It was revealed that Calvin had a fear of driving after an incident where he crashed a go-kart into a duck pond and since used Hayley as his personal driver. With advice from Mick, Calvin overcame his fear to save the other Rangers from Tangleweb.

As the Yellow Ninja Steel Ranger, Calvin commands the Nitro Zord which resembles a dump truck. In addition, Calvin has a name for his personal vehicle, his yellow truck as "Nitro", and treats his truck as if it was living.

Calvin Maxwell is portrayed by Nico Greetham.

Hayley Foster
Hayley Foster is a teenager who has a love for the outdoors, nature, and healthy living. She owns a pet Siberian Husky named Kody. Hayley became the White Ninja Steel Ranger upon being saved from Ripperat by the Nexus Prism. She is also Calvin's girlfriend and personal driver at the time he had the fear of driving. Her father Aaron (portrayed by Marcus Johnson) is a marine biologist and first appears in "Making Waves".

As the White Ninja Steel Ranger, Hayley commands the Kodiak Zord which resembles Kody.

Hayley Foster is portrayed by Zoe Robins.

Sarah Thompson
Sarah Thompson is the brains of the team and an adrenaline junkie. She intends to be a great engineer and is the person who designs gadgets to suit the Rangers' needs. As a new student at Summer Cove High, arriving on her handmade hoverboard, she runs into Monty and Victor. After Victor tries to use her hoverboard and crashes into Preston's magic show she and Preston notice objects falling from the sky. She and Preston go to investigate and save Brody Romero from the alien Korvaka. The three of them then pull out three of the Ninja Power Stars from the Ninja Nexus Prism and become Power Rangers, with Sarah becoming the Pink Ranger. Her mother Jackie (Jodie Rimmer) is also an engineer which is where Sarah gets her engineering talents from.

As the Pink Ninja Steel Ranger, Sarah commands the Zoom Zord which is a bullet train-themed Zord that resembles her hoverboard.

Sarah Thompson is portrayed by Chrysti Ane.

Aiden Romero/Levi Weston
Levi Weston is a country singer. Levi Weston is the alias of Aiden Romero who got separated from his brother Brody following Galvanax's attack on their father Dane Romero and took the alias as a way to hide in plain sight from Galvanax. At some point while working on his next album, he was captured and experimented upon by Madame Odius that involved the Gold Ninja Power Star that found him. His disappearance resulting being reported by his manager Tom. One part of Madame Odius' experiments on him was that she transferred his memories of being Aiden Romero into a human-like robot.

After being freed by the Astro Zord, Levi fought off every contestant that Madame Odius sent after him. His true identity was revealed when he fought Ripcon after he captured Tom and had trapped the Rangers in a net. He fought off Ripcon and even helped the Rangers fight a Skullgator. Following the battle, Levi meets Mick Kanic who gives him the Storm Star and the Zord Star. When the Aiden Romero Robot is destroyed and following the destruction of Ripcon, Levi regained his memories of being Aiden in time for Summer Cove High's talent show. Brody learned the truth about Aiden/Levi when he joins him in singing the song that their father wrote for them.

As the Gold Ranger, Levi/Aiden commands the Robo Rider Zord and the Ninja Bull Zord, which combine to form the Bull Rider Megazord.

Levi Weston/Aiden Romero is portrayed by Jordi Webber, while young Aiden is portrayed by Ethan Buckwell.

Zords

Ninja Steel Zords
The Ninja Steel Zords summoned by the Ninja Steel Rangers using their Ninja Power Stars.
 Robo Red Zord: Brody Romero's personal Zord is a small red ninja humanoid Zord that resembles Redbot.
 Nitro Zord: Calvin Maxwell's personal dump truck-themed Zord. Nitro Zord forms the torso in the Ninja Steel Megazord formations, normally forming the left arm unless an auxiliary Zords take Robo Red Zord's place in the formations.
 Kodiak Zord: Hayley Foster's personal dog-themed Zord that resembles Kody, normally seen riding in Zoom Zord.
 Dragon Zord: Preston Tien's personal European dragon-themed Zord.
 Zoom Zord: Sarah Thompson's personal bullet train-themed Zord that resembles her hoverboard.

Auxiliary Zords
Auxiliary Zords can combine into different formations and support in the battle.
 Rumble Tusk Zord: An elephant-themed auxiliary Zord that can transform into a humanoid mode.
 Astro Zord: A flying saucer/unidentified flying object-themed auxiliary Zord that can transform into a humanoid mode.
 Sub Surfer Zord: A surfer/submarine-themed auxiliary Zord that can transform into a humanoid mode with a surfboard. It was created by Aaron Foster (Hayley's dad) and Jackie Thompson (Sarah's mom).
 Robo Rider Zord: Levi Weston's personal Zord is a small blue ninja humanoid Zord riding the Ninja Bull Zord.
 Ninja Bull Zord: An ATV karakuri machine-themed Zord.
 Lion Fire Zord: Princess Viera's personal lion/tank-themed Zord that can transform into the Lion Fire Megazord and performs the Lion Fire Spin Strike attack, as well as performs the Lion Fire Slash finisher. Later, she allows Brody to pilot the Lion Fire Zord, eventually handing over the Zord to the Rangers to use.

Ninja Blaze Zords
After, Madame Odius' Foxatron managed to take down 3 Megazords. Later, the Ninja Blaze Zords was introduced by the three mysterious cloaked figures. The Ninja Blaze Megazord destroys Foxatron with the Ranger Blast Final Attack forcing Madame Odius, injured at her face, to retreat with Badonna and plan her revenge.
 Falcon Zord: Brody Romero's Vermillion Bird/glider-themed secondary personal Zord.
 Serpent Zord: Preston Tien's Azure Dragon/motorcycle-themed secondary personal Zord.
 Tortoise Zord: Calvin Maxwell's Black Tortoise/tank-themed secondary personal Zord.
 Tiger Zord: Hayley Foster's White Tiger/4WD vehicle-themed secondary personal Zord.
 Panda Zord: Sarah Thompson's panda/helicopter-themed secondary personal Zord.
 Piranha Zord: Levi Weston's carp/submarine-themed secondary personal Zord.

Megazords
 Ninja Steel Megazord: The combination of the core five Ninja Steel Power Rangers' main Ninja Steel Zords. Armed with the Dragon Sword and Dragon Shield, its finisher is the Master Slash.
 Ninja Steel Megazord Dragon Formation: An alternate combination with Dragon Zord taking the center position of Ninja Steel Megazord. Armed with the Dragon Wing Whip and Dragon Tail Whip, its finisher is the Dragon Lightning.
 Rumble Tusk Ninja Steel Megazord: An alternate combination with Rumble Tusk Zord taking the center position of Ninja Steel Megazord. Armed with the twin axes, its finisher is the Double Axe.
 Astro Ninja Steel Megazord: An alternate combination with Astro Zord taking the center position of Ninja Steel Megazord. Armed with the Astro Launcher, its finisher is the Cosmic Blast.
 Sub Surfer Ninja Megazord: An alternate combination with Sub Surfer Zord taking the center position of Ninja Steel Megazord. Armed with the Dragon Sword, its finisher is the Riptide Slash.
 Bull Rider Megazord: The combination of the Robo Rider Zord and the Ninja Bull Zord. Armed with the Bull Rifle, its finisher is the Rodeo Rapid Fire.
 Ninja Fusion Zord: The combination of the Ninja Steel Megazord and Bull Rider Megazord. Armed with the Bull-Dragon Sword, its finisher is the Ninja Fusion Zord Master Slash.
 Ninja Blaze Megazord: The combination of the Falcon Zord, Serpent Zord, Tortoise Zord, Tiger Zord, Panda Zord and Piranha Zord that can perform the Blaze Zord Fury Punch, Ninja Blaze Burning Blast, Ninja Blaze Star Blitz, Blaze Hydro Shield and Serpent Punch attacks, as well as perform the Ranger Blast finisher.
 Ninja Steel Ultrazord: The combination of the Ninja Steel Megazord, Bull Rider Megazord and Lion Fire Megazord that can perform the Red Ranger Solo Strike and Ninja Ultra Strike attacks, as well as perform the Ninja Ultrazord Blast finisher.
 Ninja Blaze Ultrazord: The combination of the Ninja Blaze Megazord, Bull Rider Megazord and Lion Fire Megazord that can perform the Blaze Ultra Blitz and Blaze Ultra Strike attacks, as well as perform the Ninja Blaze Firestorm finisher.

Allies

Redbot
Redbot is a robot that Brody befriends while they were slaves on Galvanax's ship. He serves as the inspiration for the Robo Red Zord.

Redbot is performed by Kohji Mimura in Ninja Steel, Emma Carr in Super Ninja Steel, and voiced by Byron Coll.

Mick Kanic
Mick Kanic is an alien slave from the Lion Galaxy with the ability to shapeshift into inanimate objects and was the head mechanic onboard Galvanax's ship until he, Brody and Redbot escaped via the garbage chute. His servitude on Galvanax's ship was because Princess Viera's family sold him and 100 other inhabitants of the Lion Galaxy to Galvanax.

After escaping, Mick became separated from Brody and Redbot, meeting up with Calvin and Hayley. They take him to their high school where Mick is mistaken for the new shop teacher by Principal Hastings and is hired on the spot.

Mick is exceptionally gifted with mechanical engineering and repair, being the top Mechanic on the Warrior Dome. He also knows a great deal about Power Rangers and the Ninja Nexus Prism, to the point he created more Ninja Power Stars for the Rangers needs.

When Mick encountered Princess Viera, he told the Rangers about what her family had done to him and the Lion Galaxy inhabitants that were sold to Galvanax. Following Drillion's defeat, Princess Viera made amends with Mick by enabling him to contact his parents. Mick tells his parents that he is not coming home yet as he is helping the Rangers in their fight against Galvanax's forces.

Mick and Dane Romero were able to morph into their own variations of the Ninja Steel Red Ranger. Following Galvanax's destruction, Mick states to the Rangers that he is going to take a space taxi and pay a visit to his parents.

Mick later returns to Earth on a space taxi to warn the Rangers about the new season of "Galaxy Warriors", and thus have no choice to stay with Rangers, as he felt they still needed him when "Galaxy Warriors" still around to hunt the Rangers.

General Tynamon uses Madame Odius' mind-control device to take control of Mick. After making a cover-up that is going to the Lion Galaxy to visit his sick parents, a mind-controlled Mick tells Madame Odius that he can make a satellite to expand Madame Odius' mind-control plot.

At the end of the series, Mick and Redbot choose to remain on Earth with the Rangers while maintaining contact with his parents in the Lion Galaxy.

Mick Kanic is portrayed by Kelson Henderson and returns in Power Rangers Dino Fury.

Dane Romero
Dane Romero is the father of both Brody and Aiden Romero/Levi Weston, as well as the original Ninja Steel Red Ranger before the former. Dane is also an alumnus of Summer Cove High twenty years. After his wife passed away, sometimes after Brody’s birth, Dane taught them the way of ninja and their signature Romero family song. He was the first to discover that the Ninja Nexus Prism landed on his yard, and was chosen to be its guardian. While inventing the Ninja Steels, his family was attacked by Galvanax and his Galaxy Warriors. Despite Dane’s supposed sacrifice on splitting the Ninja Nexus Star into six Power Stars, Brody had been kidnapped by Galvanax, while Aiden managed to escape and secure the Ninja Steel inside his father's high school trophy.

In "Galvanax Rises", Dane’s soul is revealed to have been preserved inside the Ninja Nexus Prism, and is later revived without physically aging, while also becoming another variation of the Red Ranger alongside Mick. Following Galvanax's destruction, Dane and both of his sons along with the other Rangers, Mick and Redbot are having a camp together.

Shortly before the new season of “Galaxy Warriors”, Dane briefly appears putting his trophy which was used to contain the Ninja Steel back to his old alma mater, then bidding his two sons a good luck for their school days before departing back home.

At some point after Madame Odius begins her final plan to enslave humanity while taking the power of the Super Ninja Nexus Prism for herself, Dane is one of the brainwashed victims. The brainwashed Dane is enlisted to guard both Odius and the brainwashed Mick. Against his will, the brainwashed Dane attacked both of his sons and Preston, until Hayley and Sarah destroy the mind control machine situated on the Galaxy Warriors airship, thereby freeing Dane and the rest of brainwashed victims.

Dane Romero is portrayed by Mike Edward.

Princess Viera
Princess Viera is the princess of the Lion Galaxy with the ability to shapeshift. Her family was responsible for selling 100 Lion Galaxy inhabitants to Galvanax, one of them being Mick Kanic. 
Princess Viera is the owner of the Lion Fire Zord which serves as her mode of transportation.

Sometime later, Princess Viera arrived at the Warrior Dome ship to take her opportunity at fighting the Rangers on "Galaxy Warriors" with the aid of her royal guard Drillion. While she believes her family's "Might Makes Right" way, she doesn't seem to follow it as Sarah's kindness confirms this. This causes Princess Viera to turn against Galvanax, causing him to convince Drillion into overthrowing her. This plot failed with the help of the Rangers as Princess Viera plans to bring change to the Lion Galaxy. She makes amends with Mick Kanic by enabling him to contact his parents.

Princess Viera later sends the Rangers Ninja Stars associated with the Lion Fire Zord and the Lion Fire Armor and a Lion Galaxy Spellbook for Preston to practice with.

Princess Viera is portrayed by Ruby Love.

Sheriff Skyfire
Sheriff Skyfire is an intergalactic police officer.

He crashed the latest episode of "Galaxy Warriors" to arrest Blammo for his illegal demolition activity. Madame Odius appeared where she tricks Sheriff Skyfire into going after the Rangers. Both sides duel until they rescue an elderly woman that nearly got caught in the crossfire. Realizing that he was lied to, Sheriff Skyfire agrees to help the Rangers while being informed of every monster that attacked Earth on Madame Odius' behalf. In addition, he gives a morality lesson to the Rangers on respecting law enforcement like when Hayley got ticketed by Summer Cove High School's security guard Clint. When the bomb that Blammo planted was destroyed, Sheriff Skyfire assisted in fighting Blammo and lent his sword to Brody to defeat Blammo. After Blammo was hit by the Gigantify Ray, Sheriff Skyfire watched the fight. Following Blammo's destruction, Sheriff Skyfire thanked the Rangers and teleported away to receive his next assignment from his superiors.

Sheriff Skyfire is voiced by Mark Mitchinson.

Legendary Rangers
The Ninja Steel Rangers got to work with the Legendary Rangers when it came to the threat of Lord Draven.

Dr. Tommy Oliver
He is the original Green Ranger. He also appears as the original White Ranger, the Zeo Red Ranger, and the Black Dino Ranger. He was also T.J.'s predecessor as the first Red Turbo Ranger. He is now a father to a son named J.J. He is portrayed by Jason David Frank.

Rocky DeSantos
He is the second Red Ranger and successor to Jason Lee Scott, The first Red Ranger. He was also the Blue Zeo Ranger. He is portrayed by Steve Cardenas.

Katherine Hillard
She is the first Pink Turbo Ranger who is also succeeded by Cassie Chan, T.J.'s teammate. She was also the second Pink Ranger succeeding Kimberly Ann Hart, and the Pink Zeo Ranger. She is portrayed by Catherine Sutherland.

T.J. Johnson
He is the Blue Space Ranger, and was also Tommy's successor as the second Red Turbo Ranger. He is portrayed by Selwyn Ward.

Wesley Collins 
He is the Red Time Force Ranger and successor of Alex, former Red Time Force Ranger who is also his descendant. He is portrayed by Jason Faunt.

Trent Fernandez-Mercer
He is the Dino Thunder White Ranger, and both ally and former student of Tommy. He is portrayed by Jeffrey Parazzo.

Gemma 
She is the RPM Silver Ranger who comes from the RPM reality. She is portrayed by Li Ming Hu.

Antonio Garcia
He is the Gold Samurai Ranger. He is portrayed by Steven Skyler.

Gia Moran
She is the Yellow Megaforce Ranger. She is portrayed by Ciara Hanna.

Koda
He is the Blue Dino Charge Ranger and a caveman who comes from the Dino Charge reality who fought against Sledge. Koda appeared again in the Christmas special "The Poisy Show" and meet Sledge and his crew from his former timeline again one last time. He is portrayed by Yoshi Sudarso.

Supporting characters

Victor Vincent
Victor Vincent is an unpopular, pretentious and athletic student who is the class president of Summer Cove High School and has a massive ego. Victor is always coming up with plans to become popular with Monty's help which often goes comically awry. He has 49 trophies and attempts to collect the 50th trophy by cheating, though his cheating is always revealed and ends up hilarious.

In "Helping Hand," Victor and Monty's magnetic device for shop class attracting the Ninja Stars which caught the attention of a Buzzcam. While Galvanax has Madame Odius and the Basher Bots take Victor and Monty as hostages, Galvanax makes plans for the season finale of "Galaxy Warriors".

In "Galvanax Rises," Victor and Monty are roped in by Madame Odius into building the Mega-Magnet to help her in destroying the Rangers. Both of them managed to escape and tell the news media about their survival.

In "Echoes of Evil," the two try to sell products that they used during the escape and got a lot of money and they dropped out of school claiming that they are done with it. However, the cans didn't work against Smellaphant and they were forced to give all the money back and go back to school where Principal Hastings reluctantly gave in to their demands as the check they gave her is no longer good.

In "Doom Signal," Victor and Monty win Gorrox's audition which led to them getting captured by Basher Bots and used to entertain the Galaxy Warriors audience as part of Madame Odius' plan to brainwash the people of Earth.

In "Reaching the Nexus," Victor and Monty help evacuate the people from the Warrior Dome ship. Before escaping themselves, they threw the explosive juggling balls towards Badonna and Cosmo Royale. After Madame Odius is destroyed, the two of them are honored by the Mayor of Summer Cove. This enabled Victor to finally win his 50th trophy and everyone (including Rangers) agreed he deserved received that thropy.

Victor Vincent is portrayed by Chris Reid.

Monty
Monty is a nerd at Summer Cove High School who is often being bullied by Victor to do things for him. Monty would help Victor in his plans to become popular which often go comically awry.

In "Helping Hand," Victor and Monty's magnetic device for shop class attracting the Ninja Stars which caught the attention of a Buzzcam. While Galvanax has Madame Odius and the Basher Bots take Victor and Monty as hostages, Galvanax makes plans for the season finale of "Galaxy Warriors".

In "Galvanax Rises," Victor and Monty are roped in by Madame Odius into building the Mega-Magnet to help her in destroying the Rangers. Both of them managed to escape and tell the news media about their survival.

In "Echoes of Evil," the two try to sell products that they used during the escape and got a lot of money and they dropped out of school claiming that they are done with it. However, the cans didn't work against Smellaphant and they were forced to give all the money back and go back to school where Principal Hastings reluctantly gave in to their demands as the check they gave her is no longer good.

In "Doom Signal," Victor and Monty win Gorrox's audition which led to them getting captured by Basher Bots and used to entertain the Galaxy Warriors audience as part of Madame Odius' plan to brainwash the people of Earth.

In "Reaching the Nexus," Victor and Monty help evacuate the people from the Warrior Dome ship. Before escaping themselves, they threw the explosive juggling balls towards Badonna and Cosmo Royale. After Madame Odius is destroyed, the two of them are honored by the Mayor of Summer Cove.

Monty is portrayed by Caleb Bendit.

Summer Cove High School faculty
The following are the staff members at Summer Cove High School:

Principal Hastings
Principal Hastings is the strict but fair principal of Summer Cove High School. She was the one who hired Mick Kanic upon mistaking him as the new shop teacher.

Principal Hastings is portrayed by Amanda Billing.

Mrs. Finch
Mrs. Finch is a teacher at Summer Cove High School. In "Outfoxed," it is revealed that she is married as she has a wedding ring that had to be rescued from the sewer by Calvin and Hayley. Her character are similar like Mrs. Collins from Big Time Rush.

Mrs. Finch is portrayed by Claire Chitham.

Mrs. Bell
Mrs. Bell is a school secretary at Summer Cove High School.

Mrs. Bell is portrayed by Lori Dungey.

Mr. Lunt
Mr. Lunt is the drama teacher at Summer Cove High School.

Mr. Lunt is portrayed by Peter Elliott.

Clint
Clint is the school security guard at Summer Cove High School.

Clint is portrayed by Byron Coll.

Galaxy Warriors
Galvanax is an Oni-themed alien who is the reigning champion of the popular intergalactic game show "Galaxy Warriors" where contestants battle to prove who is the mightiest warrior.

Ten years ago, he came to Earth in search of the Ninja Nexus Star, meeting opposition from ninja master Dane Romero. When Galvanax struck the Star with his staff, its energies transformed Dane into the Red Ranger where he engaged Galvanax in battle. Unfortunately, Dane is defeated and Galvanax proceeds to absorb the Star's energies. Unwilling to let the Star fall into evil hands, Dane shatters it with his katana sword, separating it into six separate Ninja Power Stars, disappearing in a tremendous explosion, leaving the stars sealed within the Nexus Prism. Galvanax and his crew take Dane's son Brody captive as well as taking the Prism, with Galvanax vowing to remove the Ninja Stars to acquire their power.

After the Rangers get their hands on the stars, Galvanax sends each of the contestants of Galaxy Warriors to take the stars back from them.

At the end of "Helping Hand," Galvanax gets the Rangers' Ninja Stars except for their Power Stars due to Victor and Monty's magnetic device attracting them which caught the attention of a Buzzcam. While Galvanax has Madame Odius and the Basher Bots take Victor and Monty as hostages, Galvanax makes plans for the season finale of "Galaxy Warriors".

In "Galvanax Rises," Galvanax puts the season finale of "Galaxy Warriors" at hand by engaging the Rangers in a final showdown. He starts by unleashing the Basher Bots on the Rangers before using Victor and Monty's magnet to steal their Ninja Power Stars. While the other Rangers were captured, Brody destroyed the magnet leaving him to fight Galvanax until Brody gets away with Mick. Galvanax and the Basher Bots catch up to Brody and Mick where he demands that Brody hands over his Ninja Power Star in exchange that he won't have the Basher Bots destroy Sarah, Preston, Calvin, Hayley, and Levi. After Brody destroys his Ninja Power Star in an attempt to keep it from falling into Galvanax' hands, both sides were surprised when the fragments formed three Red Ninja Power Stars which resulted in Mick becoming another Red Ranger and the return of Dane Romero as the original Red Ranger. All eight Rangers then fought Galvanax where he melted all the other Power Stars and drank them as he uses his new abilities to attack the Rangers. Galvanax orders Cosmo Royale to use the Gigantify Ray which the audience supports. Upon Galvanax being enlarged, Madame Odius activated the Mega-Magnet to attract every Ninja Steel present including the Ninja Steel ingested by Galvanax as Madame Odius reveals her motives. However, the Mega-Magnet attracts the Ninja Steel meteor which strikes Galvanax' ship as Galvanax plans to continue destroying the Rangers. Using the Ninja Nexus Morph Final Attack, the Rangers destroy Galvanax.

Galvanax is voiced by Richard Simpson.

Madame Odius
Madame Odius is a sly kitsune-themed alien who is first seen as Galvanax's advisor until she is revealed to be the true main antagonist of the Ninja Steel seasons. She is seen to possess a hammer-like object capable of performing magical spells. She and Ripcon accompanied Galvanax where they fought Dane Romero. When he suddenly disappeared during battle, she was present when Galvanax made off with Brody.

10 years later, Madame Odius pitched an idea to Galvanax in order to make new stars upon acquiring the Ninja Steel. Galvanax doesn't know, but Madame Odius plots against him and had successfully obtained the Gold Ninja Power Star. She begins by doing an experiment on it in a secret room on the ship with a civilian that she captured, a country singer named Levi Weston, whom Madame Odius captured in the same time after Levi pulled out the Gold Ninja Power Star from the Ninja Nexus Prism. However, the Astro Zord found and rescued Levi and escaped to Earth while after taking the Gold Ninja Star along with it to becoming a Gold Ninja Steel Ranger.

Madame Odius later created the Aiden Romero Robot using Levi Weston's memories of being Aiden Romero in order to get close to the Ninja Steel Rangers' base. Upon the robot's destruction, Madame Odius pinned the blame for its creation on Ripcon.

In "Galvanax Rises," Madame Odius ropes in Victor and Monty into building the Mega-Magnet to help her in destroying the Rangers and Galvanax. Upon Galvanax being enlarged, Madame Odius activated the Mega-Magnet to attract every Ninja Steel present including the Ninja Steel ingested by Galvanax as Madame Odius reveals her motives. However, the Ninja Steel meteor is also attracted as it strikes Galvanax' ship which sends it flying far into space. Though Madame Odius survives the unexpected meteor strike as she states that it's not over yet.

In "Echoes of Evil,” She and Cosmo Royale later encountered Sledge and Wrench who escaped from a blackhole and wanted the Ninja Super Steel Meteor in the Warrior Dome's ship. In exchange for the Ninja Super Steel Meteor, Sledge will repair the ship. Madame Odius allows Sledge to repair the ship where she gained Badonna as a servant. Then Madame Odius plans to have Cosmo Royale begin the new season of Galaxy Warriors.

When it came to the Galactic Ninjas, Madame Odius managed to salvage Wolvermean's Ninja Medal to further her plot. Then she salvaged Speedwing's Speed Star upon his destruction. Madame Odius tells Badonna that she has plans for them.

After Rygore's death by the Rangers, Odius claimed his medallion and she is later approached by Badonna, Venoma and four Foxbots. She then took her Ninja Medallion which is used with those of the other Galactic Ninjas and her Foxbots to help create her Megazord Foxatron. After defeating the Rangers' Megazords, Foxatron ran out of energy. Madame Odius threatens Venoma, demanding an explanation for what happened. Venoma states that the Ninja Medallions just need to be recharged and by tomorrow at the same time the Foxatron will have enough power to destroy the Rangers once and for all.

In “Outfoxed,” After Foxatron was recharged, Madame Odius uses it to destroy Wolvermean before facing off against the Rangers. The Ninja Blaze Megazord destroys Foxatron with the Ranger Blast Final Attack forcing Madame Odius, injured at her face, to retreat with Badonna and plan her revenge.

In "Magic Misfire" after Tynamon kidnaps Mick and brainwashes him, Odius launches her final plan that involves a brainwashed Mick building a satellite to boost the power of her mind-control device.

In "Doom Signal" despite Brax's death, Odius succeeds in her ultimate plan: using her mind control device to brainwash all the humans, including Calvin the Yellow Ranger except the others Rangers, Redbot, Victor, and Monty. She plans to use the humans as her personal army to conquer the universe.

In "Reaching the Nexus", when the Rangers thwart her mind-control plot, Madame Odius manages to absorb the powers of the Ninja Nexus Star and assume a Kyubi-like appearance that grants her enhanced strength, combat prowess, increased magic attacks, and endurance. Odius is no match for a whole team of those with equal powers to hers, falling in the final battle when the Rangers combine their Power Stars with the Nexus Power and bringing peace to Earth.

Madame Odius is voiced by Jacque Drew.

Aiden Romero Robot
The Aiden Romero Robot is a human-like android that was created by Madame Odius in order to get close to the Ninja Steel Rangers. Another component that Madame Odius used was Levi Weston's memory of being Aiden Romero.

While Ripcon went on a rampage, the Aiden Romero Robot infiltrated the Ninja Steel Rangers' hideout where he knocks out Mick Kanic and Redbot to steal the Ninja Steel until Levi enters. Levi fights the Aiden Romero Robot where Levi discovers his true form underneath. The other Rangers arrive where Sarah, Preston, Calvin, and Hayley shoot the robot and its destruction enables Levi to regain his memories. Despite being the robot's maker, Madame Odius was able to frame Ripcon for creating him. Odis answers that she has nothing left to hide.

The Aiden Romero robot is portrayed by Nick Beckwith.

Ripcon
Ripcon is a masked Goryō-themed alien swordsman with white hair who is loyal to Galvanax. He and Madame Odius accompanied Galvanax where they fought Dane Romero. When he suddenly disappeared during battle, Ripcon helped Galvanax capture with Brody who Ripcon would nickname "rat bait".

10 years later, Ripcon came to check up on Brody and Redbot to see how they are doing their job. He is also suspicious about Madame Odius and is often fighting Brody when accompanying a "Galaxy Warriors" contestant into battle. Ripcon loses one of his horns thanks to Brody's attack in "Gold Rush". Ripcon later figured out Madame Odius' plot that involved the Gold Ranger.

The Aiden Romero Robot has Ripcon help him cause havoc in Summer Cove so that he can find the Ninja Steel Rangers' base. Brody duels with Ripcon while the Rangers fought the Basher Bots. Using the Ninja Fusion Star, Brody uses the Ninja Fusion Fury Final Attack to defeat Ripcon. Though Ripcon got away. Upon being given a final chance by Galvanax and being framed for being the one who held Levi Weston on his ship, Ripcon is hit with the Gigantify Ray by Cosmo Royale who also unleashes two Skullgators to help him. The Rangers summon the Ninja Steel Megazord and the Bull Rider Megazord to help fight Ripcon and the Skullgators. The two Skullgators later fuse into a sword that Ripcon uses to fight the Megazords. Using the Fusion Star, the Rangers combined the Ninja Steel Megazord and the Bull Rider Megazord to form the Ninja Fusion Zord where it separates the sword back into the two Skullgators that comprise it. Ripcon and the two Skullgators were then destroyed by the Ninja Fusion Zord.

Ripcon is voiced by Campbell Cooley.

Cosmo Royale
Cosmo Royale is the energetic alien game show host of "Galaxy Warriors" who commentates on the fights that are seen on "Galaxy Warriors".

Outside of unleashing the Buzzcams to record the fights from his top hat, making comments about the fights, and keeping an eye on the ratings, Cosmo Royale is responsible for operating the unidentified Stage Machine where the blue button activates the Gigantify Ray that would be used on a defeated contestant and the red button unleashes a Skullgator. The yellow button is revealed to send someone to Earth. Which button Cosmo Royale pushes upon the contestant's defeat depends on the unanimous vote of the Warrior Dome's audience.

Cosmo Royale once used a trap in the form of the board game "Grave Robber" as seen in the titular episode in order to make the Rangers fight for their lives against defeated "Galaxy Warrior" contestants like Trapsaw, Hacktrack, Slogre, Spinferno, and two Skullgators as part of the Halloween episode of Galaxy Warriors. When Levi joined the fight against the Skullgators, Cosmo's plot was thwarted when Levi threw the board game's hourglass up into the sky as the Rangers destroyed it.

In "Galvanax Rises," Victor and Monty nearly trick Cosmo Royale into sending them off the ship while disguised as Kudabots. Though Cosmo Royale figured them out when he remembered that Kudabots can't talk as he and Madame Odius unleash the Bashers on them. Cosmo Royale was disgusted when the space slop Monty ate caused him to fart a lot enabling Victor and Monty to hit the yellow button on Cosmo Royale's stage machine to teleport them off the ship. When the Ninja Steel meteor struck Galvanax' ship and sent it far into space, Cosmo Royale survived the meteor strike and then went to work for Madame Odius.

Cosmo Royale and Odius later encountered Sledge and Wrench who emerged from a wormhole from the "Dino Charge" reality and wanted the Ninja Super Steel Meteor in the Warrior Dome's ship. In exchange for the Ninja Super Steel Meteor, Sledge will repair the ship. After that was done, Madame Odius plans to have Cosmo Royale begin the new season of Galaxy Warriors.

During the Rangers' final battle with Madame Odius in "Reaching the Nexus", Cosmo Royale and Badonna were struck by explosive balls thrown by Victor and Monty which sent the Warrior Dome ship into outer space.

Cosmo Royale is voiced by Campbell Cooley.

Badonna
Badonna is an Aonyōbō-themed alien who was originally a prisoner on Sledge's ship which emerged from the wormhole leading from the Dino Charge reality's previous timeline. While working to help repair the Warrior Dome ship as part of Sledge's deal to obtain the Ninja Super Steel meteor that crashed into it, Badonna secretly told Madame Odius on what Sledge plans to do with it. Madame Odius freed Badonna from Sledge's custody after proving her loyalty and Badonna assists her in finding the Ninja Nexus.

After the plot involving Game Goblin failed, Badonna tells Madame Odius that she has booked the Galactic Ninjas to appear in the next episode of "Galaxy Warriors".

Badonna later develops a crush on Brax when he and General Tynamon join up with Madame Odius. She is later devastated when Brax is destroyed.

During the Rangers' final battle with Madame Odius in "Reaching the Nexus", Cosmo Royale and Badonna were struck by explosive balls thrown by Victor and Monty which sent the Warrior Dome ship into outer space.

Badonna is voiced by Marissa Stott.

General Tynamon
General Tynamon is a tiny Koromodako-themed alien in a Koromodako-themed robot armor who came to the Warrior Dome Ship along with Brax and become Madame Odius' new associates. He gets annoyed with Badonna acting romantic around Brax to which Badonna tells him not to interfere if he doesn't want his secret leaked. General Tynamon confronts the Rangers where he introduces Brax to them. At one point during this time, Sarah commented that General Tynamon's appearance does resemble that of a garden gnome.

In "Car Trouble" after Voltipede is destroyed, Tynamon finds the Ninja Fusion Star and brings it back to Madame Odius.

In "Happy to Be Me" after having stolen the Ninja Fusion Star during the Rangers' fight with Voltipede, General Tynamon uses a spell to steal Levi's voice then combines the Ninja Fusion Star with Odius's hammer and six Skullgators unleashed by Cosmo Royale to form Megamauler in his giant form. But his plan fails when Levi regains his voice with the help of Preston finding a spell to undo General Tynamon's voice-switching spell, destroy Megamauler thanks to his new Super Star mode, and retake the Ninja Fusion Star. After Levi defeats him, General Tynamon says that he will have his revenge and retreats.

In "Magic Misfire," Madame Odius extracts the smaller General Tynamon from his armor and gives him a weapon to use on Mick in exchange for his true form being enlarged. While the Rangers respond to Buzzcam activity in Hill Crest Quarry that involves Brax, General Tynamon sneaks into Summer Cove High School and uses Madame Odius's weapon on Mick. As Brody is still repairing his Ninja Star, the Rangers fight General Tynamon as Preston uses the Lion Fire Armor Star and Levi his Super Star mode. Both of Preston and Levi's attacks fail to defeat General Tynamon. After Hayley destroys General Tynamon's armor by shooting at its face, General Tynamon bails from the body as Cosmo Royale gets approval from Madame Odius to use the Gigantify Ray on him. The Rangers form the Ninja Fusion Zord as General Tynamon uses the Toxic Tangle on them. Preston summons the Lion Fire Zord for help. General Tynamon was destroyed by the Ninja Ultrazord.

General Tynamon is voiced by Estevez Gillespie.

Brax
Brax is a general with hand-like shapes on his body who came to the Warrior Dome Ship along with General Tynamon and become Madame Odius' new associates where he is also an unrequited love interest for Badonna. In his first fight with the Rangers, Brax fakes being weak and retreats in order to fool the Rangers. By the next fight, Brax uses his full power on the Rangers. When the Rangers start to turn the tide against Brax, Badonna activates the Gigantify Ray and sends some Skullgators to assist Brax. After a fight with the Megazords, Brax retreats while the Skullgators are destroyed.

In "Car Trouble", Brax is seen when General Tynamon shows Madame Odius the Ninja Fusion Star which he claimed after Voltipede's defeat.

In "Magic Misfire," Brax appears at Hill Crest Quarry to fight the Rangers as a diversion so that General Tynamon can brainwash Mick. Brax defeats Brody in battle causing the Rangers to retreat.

In "Doom Signal," Brax joins Gorrox in battle where they are both hit with the Gigantify Ray. After Gorrox is destroyed by the Ninja Ultrazord, Brax does a powerful attack on the Ninja Ultrazord and the Ninja Steel Megazord. The Rangers then form the Ninja Blaze Ultrazord to fight Brax. Brax was destroyed by the Ninja Steel Megazord and the Ninja Blaze Ultrazord.

Brax is voiced by Jamie Linehan.

Galactic Ninjas
The Galactic Ninjas are a team of four animal-themed wily ninjas. At the end of "Game Plan," Badonna booked them to appear on "Galaxy Warriors". Their powers come from their special ninja medallions. Each of the Galactic Warriors also wields swords in battle. The Galactic Warriors first appear in "Attack of the Galactic Warriors" where they introduce themselves to the audience of "Galaxy Warriors". Though their medallions are salvaged by Madame Odius to help power her Zord, Foxatron.

Wolvermean
Wolvermean is a memory-stealing Mujina monster who is the leader and master of the Galactic Ninjas. He wields a Kusarigama and a shield in battle. Wolvermean is the first to go to Earth to fight the Rangers where he ambushes Hayley, Preston, and Brody and steals their memories. During his fight with the Rangers alongside the Foxbots, Wolvermean steals Sarah's memory when she throws herself in front of Calvin. Wolvermean then retreats. Using the scarecrow technique, Calvin and Levi steal the memory orbs from Wolvermean as Mick restores everyone's memories. Once that is done, the Rangers fight Wolvermean and the Foxbots. After taking down the Foxbots, the Rangers then fight Wolvermean and his Ninja Clone Technique. Brody then assumes his Lion Fire mode and defeats Wolvermean with the Whiplash Strike Final Attack. Thanks to a unanimous vote from the audience, Cosmo Royale uses the Gigantify Ray to make Wolvermean grow. The Rangers form the Ninja Steel Ultrazord and use the Ninja Ultrazord Blast Final Attack to defeat Wolvermean. While Madame Odius picks up Wolvermean's Ninja Medallion, Wolvermean survives the attack and retreats stating that it's not over.

In "The Need for Speed," Wolvermean hears that Speedwing lost his Speed Star and tells him that they'll get it back.

In "Caught Red-Handed," Wolvermean was present when Rygore was sent down to Earth to fight the Rangers.

In "Outfoxed," Wolvermean was told by Venoma about what Madame Odius is using the Ninja Medallions are being used for and confronts her. Badonna states to Wolvermean that he can have his Ninja Medallion back if he can destroy the Rangers. He and Venoma begin their attack on the city and fight the Rangers. After Venoma retreats, Wolvermean is taken down by the Ninja Steel Slash Final Attack. Though he survives the attack and escapes. Wolvermean returns as a giant and faces off against the Ninja Blaze Megazord before Foxatron can finish recharging. After Wolvermean is disarmed of his shield, Foxatron appears and destroys Wolvermean for his failure.

Wolvermean is voiced by Jamie Linehan.

Speedwing
Speedwing is a peregrine falcon monster and member of the Galactic Ninjas who is the fastest of the bunch.

In "The Need for Speed," Speedwing takes his medallion and heads to Earth claiming that the Rangers won't see him coming. While testing her suit in order to beat the hoverboard speed record, she crashed into Speedwing as the Rangers transform. Applying his Speed Star, Speedwing moves too fast for the Rangers to attack. The Rangers work to use his own speed against him which causes his Speed Star to fall off. Though Speedwing gets away. Speedwing tells Wolvermean that he'll get his Speed Star back. With footage discovered by the Cosmo Royale's Buzzcam, Speedwing is sent by Madame Odius to get it back. At the record-breaking competition, Speedwing attacks as Sarah comes clean about the use of his Speed Star in her hoverboard. The Rangers fight Speedwing as Speedwing's recovered Speed Star hits Brody's helmet. While Preston goes after Brody, the others face off against Speedwing. Thanks to a strategy by Sarah, Brody gets the broken Speed Star onto Speedwing's back causing him to run off. The Rangers confront Speedwing and Brody takes him down with the Lion Fire Strike Final Attack. Thanks to a unanimous vote from the audience, Cosmo Royale uses the Gigantify Ray to make Speedwing grow as the Rangers form the Lion Fire Zord and the Ninja Fusion Zord. This monster was destroyed by the Lion Fire Megazord and the Ninja Fusion Zord. Madame Odius then claims Speedwing's Ninja Medallion.

Speedwing is voiced by Ian Hughes.

Rygore
Rygore is an Indian rhinoceros monster and member of the Galactic Ninjas who is an expert at surprise attacks and has super-strength. In addition to his medallion that boosts his strength, he also uses a special pair of dice to create various objects to use on the Rangers like Dice Roll #3 creating a kettle to shoot scalding liquid on the Rangers.

In "Caught Red-Handed," Rygore is the third Galactic Ninja that goes down to face the Rangers. He faces the Rangers on different occasions with one of them having Rygore knock the net shot by Victor and Monty's net gun back to them when they mistook him for the Summer Cove Rhino and throwing them into the direction of Principal Hastings. On the second occasion, he is defeated by the Rangers and their clones. Thanks to a unanimous vote from the audience, Cosmo Royale makes Rygore grow. This monster was destroyed by the Ninja Ultrazord. Madame Odius then claims Rygore's Ninja Medallion.

Rygore is voiced by Charlie McDermott.

Venoma
Venoma is a wasp monster and member of the Galactic Ninjas who has poisonous charms.

In "Caught Red-Handed," Venoma is with Wolvermean when they witness Rygore heading to Earth to face the Rangers. She is later approached by Badonna and Madame Odius where they want her Ninja Medallion which is used with the Ninja Medallions of the other Galactic Ninjas and her Foxbots to help create her Megazord Foxatron. When Foxatron runs out of energy, Madame Odius scolds Venoma and plans to destroy her. Venoma states that the Ninja Medallions just need to be charged and that tomorrow at the same time she will have enough of power to destroy the Rangers once and for all.

In "Outfoxed," Venoma tells Wolvermean about Madame Odius' use of the Ninja Medallions. She and Venoma begin their attack on the city and fight the Rangers. As she can't fight without her Ninja Medallion, Venoma retreats.

In "Love Stings," Madame Odius gives Venoma her Ninja Medallion back as she plans to make people fall in love with her on Valentine's Day. When she attacks the park, Venoma hits Sandy with an arrow. When Brody is hit by an arrow, he is mesmerized into falling in love with Venoma. As Haley gets Brody away, the other Rangers fight Venoma who hits Calvin and Levi with her arrows causing the Rangers to evacuate. It was discovered that Venoma's arrows actually hit one of Sandy's books. Brody, Calvin, and Levi snuck out to find Venoma. Preston finds Venoma when he finds honey on an oil barrel and fights her. When Venoma strikes Preston with an arrow, he pretends to fall in love with Venoma thanks to a metal vest in order to destroy the last love arrow freeing Brody, Calvin, and Levi from the love spell. The rest of the Rangers catch up to Preston as he uses the Ninja Spin Final Attack on Venoma. Thanks to a unanimous vote from the audience, Cosmo Royale uses the Gigantify Ray to make Venoma grow. This monster was destroyed by the Ninja Blaze Megazord.

Venoma is voiced by Aidee Walker.

Sledge and his Crew
Sledge, Wrench, Poisandra and his crew from the Dino Charge universe's former timeline somehow manage to survive the black hole and escape through the wormhole that took them into the "original Ranger Universe" and not faded away by history alteration after their past selves are destroyed, assumed a side effect from the wormhole that keep them from been erased. When his ship comes across the Warrior Dome ship that had been struck by the Super Ninja Steel meteor, Sledge and Wrench explore the ship and meet Madame Odius and Cosmo Royale. Sledge cut a deal with Madame Odius to help fix up her ship in exchange for the Super Ninja Steel meteor where he has some of his outlaws help in repairing it. Once that was done, Sledge left with the Super Ninja Steel meteor while Madame Odius gained the service of his prisoner Badonna.

They return for one last time in "The Poisy Show" where they use the Warrior Dome for the set of Poisandra's new talk show. While Poisandra does her talk show, Sledge tells Wrench that he will get the Power Rangers' Ninja Stars. With help from Koda, the Rangers trick Sledge and Poisandra into fighting and make their escape. Before Sledge could return to Earth to recapture the Rangers, Koda left a gift for Poisandra which turned out to be a time bomb which kills Sledge, Poisandra, Wrench, Basher Bots, the last remnants of Galaxy Warriors, probably Vivix as well as Sledge's parked ship, Spikeballs, Fury and Curio too, Sledge's prisoners and the Warrior Dome ship for good this time.

However, in Power Rangers Beast Morphers, Venjix/Evox have revived them before the Grid Battleforce Rangers kill Poisandra, Curio, Wrench, and Fury, and after Goldar is revived as Goldar Maximus, Venjix had no more use for Sledge and order Goldar to kill him.

Lord Draven
Lord Draven is an armored samurai from the Antiverse who is the main villain in "Dimensions in Danger." He wields a bow in battle and can project force fields. Madame Odius was contacted by Lord Draven to assist in the conquest of the Multiverse where he would grant her the one she lives in while he rules the other realities. Using their resources, they capture some of the Rangers in order for Lord Draven to build his Ranger Clone army. With help from Wesley, Gemma, and Koda, the Ninja Steel Rangers raid his fortress and rescue the imprisoned Rangers. When his Ranger Clone army was defeated, Lord Draven was enlarged when Madame Odius activated the Gigantify Ray so that he can fire the final Mega Arrow. He is destroyed by Tommy Oliver as the White Ranger with his Ninja Falconzord combined with the Rangers' laser attacks.

Lord Draven is voiced by Rajneel Singh.

Robo Rangers
The Robo Rangers are robotic clones of each Power Rangers that are created by Lord Draven in his quest to conquer the Multiverse. Like the Cyborg Rangers, the Robo Rangers sport black gloves, spike shoulder armor, and boots. The Robo Rangers are destroyed by the Ninja Steel Rangers and the other Rangers that Lord Draven captured.

 Tommy Oliver (Robot Clone) - A robotic clone of Tommy Oliver created by Draven similar to Aiden Romero Robot, who captured seven Legendary Rangers (Tommy who will escape, Kat, T.J, Rocky, Antonio, Trent and Gia) for his master and is his second in command. He fights the real Tommy in Dino Thunder Black, and is destroyed by Tommy in Mighty Morphin Green Ranger.

Kudabots
The Kudabots are Galvanax's robotic foot soldiers in kasas that are armed with yari spears and tanegashimas. Two Kudabots are known for bringing the unidentified Stage Machine onto the stage when it comes to the decision on if the contestant should be hit with the Gigantify Ray or piloting the Warrior Dome Ship.

Basher Bots
The Basher Bots are Galvanax's alternative robotic foot soldiers that resemble upgraded versions of the Kudabots. The Bashers first appeared to help Stonedozer. They survived the meteor strike and then went to work for Madame Odius and met Sledge's Crew when they come on the Warrior Dome Ship.

Foxbots
The Foxbots are robotic fox-masked ninjas that work as the foot soldiers for the Galactic Ninjas. They first appear with Wolvermean in his fight with the Rangers.

Four Foxbots were later combined by a spell from Madame Odius in order to create Madame Odius's Megazord Foxatron which is powered by the Ninja Medallions of Wolvermean, Speedwing, Rygore and Venoma.

Skullgators
The Skullgators are Gashadokuro/alligator-themed monsters that serve as the giant foot soldiers for Galvanax. They would often be dispatched to fight the Zords upon Cosmo Royale pushing the red button on the Stage Machine.

In “Live and Learn,” The first Skullgator was unleashed following Spinferno's destruction and was the first opponent of the Ninja Steel Megazord. The Skullgator was destroyed by the Ninja Steel Megazord.

In “Gold Rush”, After Ripcon failed to defeat Levi Weston which displeased the audience, Cosmo Royale unleashed a second Skullgator to fight the Ninja Steel Megazord. With holo-clone technology made by Sarah and Mick, the Rangers attacked the Skullgator. The Skullgator was destroyed by the Ninja Steel Megazord.

In “Family Fusion,” Upon giving Ripcon a final chance to defeat the Rangers by Galvanax, Cosmo Royale uses the Gigantify Ray on him while unleashing two Skullgators to help him. Upon being hit by the Bull Rider Megazord's Rodeo Rapid Fire, the two Skullgators later fuse into a sword that Ripcon uses to fight the Megazords. Using the Fusion Star, the Rangers combine the Ninja Steel Megazord and the Bull Rider Megazord to form the Ninja Fusion Zord where it separates back into the two Skullgators. The Ninja Fusion Megazord uses the Ninja Master Zord Final Attack to destroy Ripcon and the two Skullgators.

In “The Royal Rival,” to help an enlarged Drillion, Cosmo Royale unleashes two Skullgators on Galvanax' orders. The two Skullgators are destroyed by the Ninja Fusion Zord's Fusion Slash.

In "Grave Robber” when the Rangers are trapped in Cosmo Royale's board game, Cosmo Royale unleashes a Skullgator against the Rangers where Cosmo Royale takes control of the Robo Rider Zord. It is destroyed by the Astro Ninja Steel Megazord's Cosmic Blast Final Attack. As the Robo Red Zord continues to fight the Robo Rider Zord, Cosmo Royale spices up the fight by unleashing another Skullgator. The second Skullgator is destroyed by the Bull Rider Megazord's Rodeo Rapid Blast Final Attack.

In "Prepare to Fail," Badonna unleashes four Skullgators to assist Brax in battle. While Brax gets away, the first Skullgator was destroyed by the Ninja Steel Megazord, the second Skullgator was destroyed by the Rumble Tusk Megazord, the third Skullgator was destroyed by the Astro Megazord, and the fourth Skullgator was destroyed by the Sub-Surfer Megazord.

In "Happy to Be Me," General Tynamon uses the Ninja Fusion Star and Levi's voice in order to combine six Skullgators into Megamauler.

Buzzcams
The Buzzcams are fly-type cameras that are kept under Cosmo Royale's top hat. They are unleashed by Cosmo Royale in order to film the fights on "Galaxy Warriors".

Galaxy Warriors contestants
Galvanax would have his contestants on "Galaxy Warriors" fight each other for other people's amusements and would deploy some of them to Earth to fight the Ninja Steel Rangers. Most of the contestants on "Galaxy Warriors" resemble a hybrid of a Yōkai and an item. To make a contestant grow, Cosmo Royale would hit the blue button on the Stage Machine that activates the Gigantify Ray.

 Lavagor - A robotic swordsman monster from the Extenz System. On "Galaxy Warriors," this monster was destroyed by Korvaka in combat. The episode "Presto Change-O" revealed that he had an unnamed twin brother that was dumber than he was when Galvanax was going through the portraits of the contestants on "Galaxy Warriors" to see which one he can send to fight the Rangers.
 Korvaka (voiced by Tim Raby) - A cyborg cat monster who is the first monster fought by the Ninja Steel Rangers. According to Cosmo Royale, Korvaka was the champion from the Ninninjer Galaxy. After defeating Lavagor, Korvaka was unable to pull the Ninja Star from the Ninja Nexus Prism. After Brody claimed the Red Ninja Star and the Ninja Nexus Prism, Korvaka was dispatched to catch him. When Korvaka caught up with him on Earth, he attacks Brody until Sarah and Preston show up to help him. Upon the three of them using the Ninja Stars they obtained to become the Ninja Steel Rangers, this monster was destroyed by Brody, Preston and Sarah's Ninja Blasters.
 Ripperat (voiced by Adrian Smith) - A cyborg Kamaitachi/chainsaw monster. He was dispatched by Galvanax to attack Calvin Maxwell, Hayley Roster, and Mick Kanic until the Nexus Prism saves them enough for Calvin and Hayley to become Ninja Steel Rangers. Brody, Sarah, and Preston arrive to help them fight Ripperat. Upon being taken down by Brody's Ninja Steel Slash, Ripperat is enlarged by Cosmo Royale. This monster was destroyed by the Ninja Rangers' Zords. In "The Ranger Ribbon," it is revealed that Ripperat has a twin brother named Trapsaw.
 Spinferno (voiced by Greg Ward) - A roller skating fire-elemental Kasha monster. He can expel fire and heat from his hands and move fast in his roller skates enough to form a tornado around them. Spinferno was sent down to attack the Rangers where he was repelled by Brody using the Datacom. Spinferno had attacked town as Victor and Monty try to fight him which annoys Spinferno. After Spinferno sends Victor and Monty flying, the rest of the Ninja Steel Rangers had to fight Spinferno without Brody. After some encouragement from Mick, Brody catches up to the rest of the Rangers and joins the fight against Spinferno who summons the Kudabots. With Calvin luring Spinferno back to Conifer Park, the rest of the Rangers spring their traps by performing the Element Star Forest Attack to trap him. This monster was destroyed by the Element Star Final Strike. As the audience voted to not have Spinferno "lit back up," Cosmo Royale unleashed a Skullgator instead which was destroyed by the Ninja Steel Megazord. In "Grave Robber" as the Rangers are trapped in Cosmo's game, Calvin works to free himself and the incapacitated truck driver from the gold rings that Spinferno placed on them before the truck they are on goes off a cliff.
 Slogre (voiced by Ian Hughes) - A Kappa/fire extinguisher monster. He can use a special mist that makes anyone slow. Slogre was summoned by Galvanax to fight the Rangers alongside the Kudabots. After Sarah, Calvin, and Hayley are exposed to Slogre's mists, Preston used his magic to fend off Slogre with a fiery dragon attack. With Sarah, Calvin, and Hayley getting slower, Slogre takes the opportunity to take their Ninja Power Stars. Before he can finish them off after his boasting, Brody and Preston arrive. Using a magic scarf trick, Preston restrains Slogre while Brody reclaims the Ninja Power Stars from Slogre. As Brody and Preston morph, Slogre goes on the run as Brody and Preston pursue him and use the Ninja Steel Spin Final Attack to defeat him enough for his mists on Sarah, Calvin, and Hayley to regain the spin. Thanks to a unanimous vote from the audience, Cosmo Royale uses the Gigantify Ray to make Slogre grow as the Ninja Steel Megazord is formed to fight Slogre. Upon the Ninja Steel Megazord forming the Ninja Steel Megazord Dragon Formation, the Rangers take to the air to knock down Slogre. This monster was destroyed by the Ninja Steel Megazord Dragon Formation. In "Grave Robber" while trapped in Cosmo Royale's game, the Rangers go up against Slogre and the Kudabots. While Slogre hits, Sarah, Preston, Calvin, and Hayley with his slow mist, Brody tries to attack Slogre only for Cosmo Royale to end the fight.
 Tangleweb (voiced by Jamie Linehan) - A Tsuchigumo/refrigerator monster who can shrink down to spider size, emit webs, make use of his extra arms, and turn into a purple vortex that consumes everything in its path. After Cosmo Royale was disgusted by Tangleweb regurgitating a Kudabot that he previously ate, Galvanax has Ripcon send Tangleweb down to Earth to find the Rangers. After Victor nearly stepped on him, Tangleweb wrapped Victor and Monty in a web as he continues to search for the Rangers. Following Calvin's failed driving lesson in the park, Tangleweb attacked Brody, Sarah, Preston, and Haley upon returning to normal size. He then assumes his Vortex form where he sucks in Sarah, Preston, and Haley. Then Tangleweb consumes Brody and retreats just as Calvin arrives. With some advice from Mick, Calvin decides to face his fears and allows himself to be eaten by Tangleweb. Using the new Ninja Star that Mick and Redbot forged, Calvin empowers the motorcycle into a Mega Morph Cycle where he faces his fears enough to break everyone out of Tangleweb. After Sarah causes a mist to confuse Tangleweb, the Rangers combine their attacks to take down Tangleweb. Thanks to a unanimous vote from the audience, Cosmo Royal uses the Gigantify Ray to make Tangleweb grow as the Rangers summon their Zords. Upon Tangleweb trapping the Zords in his web, the Rangers receive the Ninja Star that enables them to summon the Rumble Tusk Zord which sucks in the webs freeing the Zords. After the Rumble Tusk Zord combines with the Ninja Steel Megazord to form the Rumble Tusk Megazord, this monster was destroyed by the Rumble Tusk Megazord.
 Badpipes (voiced by Kelson Henderson) - A Tengu/clarinet monster. The music from Badpipes' bagpipes can make people do his every command when he plays his bagpipes. In addition to his flight and extending his nose, Badpipes wields a fan that can deflect attacks and perform wind attacks. Badpipes first demonstrates his powers on Cosmo Royale and the Kudabots where he makes them dance. Badpipes ambushed Hayley and Cody where he used his music to obtain her Power Star only for Redbot to arrive. Upon getting his bagpipes back, he tries to attack Hayley only to injure Redbot. Cody digs some dirt into Badpipes' face to buy Hayley and Redbot time to get away. Hayley and Redbot had to evade Bagpipes. The other Rangers fought Badpipes and Ripcon where Badpipes' music gets them to hand over their Power Stars until Hayley and Redbot arrived. As Redbot gets to safety, Badpipes and Ripcon take down the Rangers as Cody grabs the bagpipes enough for the Rangers to destroy them with their Ninja Blasters. While Brody fought Ripcon, Sarah, Preston, Calvin, and Hayley fought Badpipes. After beating Ripcon, Brody helps the other Rangers fight Badpipes. Preston and Sarah defeat Badpipes with the Aero Blast Final Strike. Thanks to a unanimous vote from the audience, Cosmo Royale uses the Gigantify Ray to make Badpipes grow as the Rangers form the Ninja Steel Megazord. Upon the Rumble Tusk Ninja Megazord being formed, Badpipes' nose was broken. This monster was  destroyed by the Rumble Tusk Megazord.
 Hacktrack (voiced by Ian Hughes) - An Ungaikyō/antenna monster. He wields an antennae weapon that can absorb technology and shoot electrical beams. In addition, he can fly. Hacktrack ambushed the Rangers alongside the Kudabots in order to steal their technology. When Sarah's hologram malfunctions, Hacktrack steals the Holo-Projector. Using the Holo-Projector, Hacktrack improves his antennae weapon to make giant holographic clones of Galvanax. In order to stop the giant holo-clones, the Rangers had to find Hacktrack. With some help from Mick, Sarah plans to trick Hacktrack with a new Holo-Projector as Hacktrack ambushes them and absorbs the Holo-Projector. Sarah revealed that she loaded the Holo-Projector with a virus that shuts down the Galvanax holo-clones. After rebooting, Hacktrack fights the Rangers where he gets hit by the water attack. The Rangers take down Hacktrack with the Steel Slash Ninja Spin Final Attack. Thanks to a unanimous vote from the audience, Cosmo Royale uses the Gigantify Ray to make Hacktrack grow as the Rangers form the Ninja Steel Megazord Dragon Formation to follow Hacktrack into the sky. As Hacktrack flies into outer space, Mick sends the Rangers the Ninja Star for the Astro Zord as they summon it. The Astro Ninja Steel Megazord is formed as they fight Hacktrack on the Moon. This monster was destroyed by the Astro Megazord. In "Grave Robber" when trapped in Cosmo's game, the Rangers fight Hacktrack as Brody and Preston chase after him in their ninja kites. Using a frequency jammer, Sarah causes Hacktrack to self-destruct.
 Stonedozer (voiced by Phil Brown) - A rock-elemental Daidarabotchi/power shovel monster. He can cause earthquakes, burrow underground, and throw rocks. Stonedozer arrived on Summer Cove to cause earthquakes. While Preston, Calvin, and Hayley fight the Bashers, Brody and Sarah infiltrate the mine where they find Stonedozer and the Bashers mining enough to destroy the stadium where Levi was going to perform. When Stonedozer discovers Brody and Sarah, he starts shaking things up causing the Rangers and Levi to evacuate the stadium. Ripcon tells Stonedozer that the Rangers are in the stadium and to bring it down on them. The Rangers managed to make it out as they confront Stonedozer and the Bashers at the quarry. While the other Rangers fight the Bashers, Levi fights Stonedozer. After fighting off Brody's ninja clones, Levi uses the Tornado Stars Storm Slash's Final Attack to defeat Stonedozer. Thanks to a unanimous vote from the audience, Cosmo Royale uses the Gigantify Ray to make Stonedozer grow. Levi summons the Bull Rider Zord and the Bull Zord to fight Stonedozer. The other Rangers form the Rumble Tusk Ninja Steel Megazord to help Levi who has the Bull Rider Zord and the Bull Zord combine into the Bull Rider Megazord. This monster was destroyed by the Bull Rider Megazord and the Rumble Tusk Megazord. 
 Trapsaw (voiced by David Van Horn) - A cyborg Kamaitachi/chainsaw monster arms who is the twin brother of Ripperat and the self-proclaimed master of traps. He can emit energy attacks from his chainsaws. When Trapsaw first appeared being interviewed by Cosmo Royale, he attempts to demonstrate the trap on Cosmo Royale only for it to backfire on him. Though Ripcon told Galvanax that they need to knock the kinks out of Trapsaw. When the trap for Brody backfired on him, Trapsaw is sent to deal with the rest of the Rangers while Ripcon fights Brody. Trapsaw and Kudabots later attack the area where the Ribbon Tree is due to nobody setting off one of the nearby traps as he plans to cut down the Ribbon Tree much to Mr. Tien's objection. Preston saves his dad from Trapsaw as Trapsaw retreats. When the Rangers catch up to Trapsaw, they fight him alongside the Kudabots until they are destroyed by the Rangers' Ninja Steel Spin Final Attack and Levi's Tornado Stars Storm Slash's Final Attack. Thanks to a unanimous vote from the audience, Cosmo Royale uses the Gigantify Ray on him. The Rangers form the Ninja Steel Megazord to fight Trapsaw. This monster was destroyed by the Ninja Steel Megazord. As for Trapsaw's final trap, it was set off by Victor and Monty. In "Grave Robber" while trapped in Cosmo's game, the Rangers fight Trapsaw and the Kudabots who are destroyed by Brody's sneak attack.
 Toxitea (voiced by Yvette Parsons) - An Enenra/kettle monster that is loyal to Madame Odius. In addition to firing teapot-shaped fireballs, she can brew a poison in her body that can kill the infected victim by sunset unless an antidote for it is administered. Toxitea led the Kudabots into ambushing Aiden Romero so that she can lure the Rangers into a trap that involves infecting Brody with her poison. Madame Odius used this as a way to get the Rangers to give up their Power Stars by sunset so that an antidote can be administered to Brody. During the fight with the Rangers, Brody claims the antidote from Madame Odius while Preston and Levi defeat Toxitea. Thanks to a unanimous vote from the audience, Cosmo Royale uses the Gigantify Ray on her. The Rangers form the Ninja Steel Megazord and the Bull Rider Megazord to fight Toxitea. This monster was destroyed by the Ninja Steel Megazord and the Bull Rider Megazord.
 Shoespike (voiced by Rowan Bettjeman impersonating Arnold Schwarzenegger) - A one-eyed Amabie/sneakers monster. He has super-speed, can turn anyone into trophies, and perform shot put attacks. Disguising himself as a racer named Bob Shoespike (portrayed by Jacob Dale) at the Lake Sunshine's event, Shoespike uses an evil baton that makes anyone race against him. After bewitching Brody and Levi into beating Sarah, Preston, and Hayley into a relay race, Shoespike turned them into trophies alongside Victor and the other losers. Shoespike then sheds his disguise and demands that they beat him in a three-legged race for the fate of the Ninja Power Stars. As Brody and Levi are paired up, Shoespike is paired with a Basher Bot as Calvin arrives. This turns into a four-legged race where Shoespike is actually running with Basher Bot dummies on a booby-trapped path. Upon the Rangers beating Shoespike in the race, his spell on the Rangers and everyone else was undone. The Rangers then fight Shoespike and the Basher Bots. Brody and Levi combine their Final Attacks to take down Shoespike. Thanks to a unanimous vote from the audience, Cosmo Royale uses the Gigantify Ray on Shoespike as Brody and Aiden summon their respective Zords to fight Shoespike. This monster was destroyed by the Ninja Fusion Zord.
 Lord Drillion  (voiced by Joseph Wycoff) - A powerful Nue/toolbox monster with a drill for a right hand who is a royal guard member that works for Princess Viera of the Lion Galaxy where he is also from. He can shoot lasers from his hand drill hand, throw buzzsaws, and change his drill hand into a wrench. Drillion came with Princess Viera to help in destroying the Ninja Steel Rangers. Arriving on Earth, Drillion faced off against the Power Rangers where the deflective blast caused Princess Viera to fall off the building that she was on. After Sarah rescues Princess Viera, Drillion is told by Princess Viera to stop the battle as they retreat. Galvanax persuades Drillion to be ready to become the new ruler of the Lion Galaxy if Princess Viera studies the Rangers and fails to destroy them. After Princess Viera blows her cover when she was confronting Sarah, Drillion shows up declaring Princess Viera a failure and attacks both of them. The rest of the Rangers arrive to fight Drillion after Princess Viera saves Sarah. After Drillion breaks the Rangers' Element Star, Princess Viera helps the Rangers and asks them to buy her some time. At Galavanx's orders, Cosmo Royale uses the Gigantify Ray to make Drillion grow and sends down two Skullgators as well. As the Ninja Fusion Zord uses the Fusion Slash to destroy the Skulgators, Drillion breaks apart the Ninja Fusion Zord with his attacks. Just then, Princess Viera shows up and the attacks from the Lion Ship causes Drillion to escape. In "The Royal Rumble," Drillion is sent to make sure the Lion Ship is destroyed. Madame Odius provides him an upgrade that gave him a toolbox for a left hand allowing Drillion to fire random tools from it. Finding the Lion Ship, Drillion prepares to attack as the Rangers arrive to fight him. The Rangers have a hard time fighting Drillion until Brody gains the Lion Fire Armor from the resulting Ninja Star. This enables Brody to outfight Drillion as the other Rangers destroy his toolbox arm. Brody then uses Lion Fire Flame Strike Final Attack to defeat Drillion. Galvanax has a Kudabot fire the Gigantify Ray on Drillion which causes him to grow and regain his toolbox arm. Mick throws the latest Ninja Star to the Lion Ship transforming it into the Lion Fire Zord to fight Drillion. Brody transforms the Lion Fire Zord into the Lion Fire Megazord where he uses the Lion Fire Spin Strike on Drillion. This monster was destroyed by the Lion Fire Megazord.
 Phonepanzee (voiced by Simon McKinney) - A Yamabiko/payphone monster. He can mimic people's voices by sampling their voices, perform a sonic boom attack, and call anyone on their phone parts. Phonepanzee began his plot to siphon the sounds of the Rangers' voice so that he can turn the Rangers against each other even during Summer Cove High School's class presidential election. Upon being sighted by the Rangers, Phonepanzee ran off as the Basher Bots attack. Phonepanzee used his voice mimicry to fool the Rangers into coming into range of his sonic boom before he got away. During the food fight started by Victor and Monty, Phonepanzee began his plot to turn the Rangers against each other so that he can steal their Power Stars in an ambush at Fraser Plaza. After tricking Brody, Sarah, and Calvin, Levi was unfooled by Phonepanzee's ruse due to Hayley being with him at the time. Arriving at Fraser Plaza, Levi and Haley assume their Ranger forms and fight Phonepanzee while Preston frees the others. Following a sneak attack on Phonepanzee, Hayley and Levi reclaim the Power Stars as Brody, Sarah, and Calvin are freed. Upon Brody, Sarah, and Calvin morphing, they join the fight against Phonepanzee and the Bashers. The Rangers use their Blade Slash Final Attack to take down Phonepanzee. Thanks to unanimous vote from the audience, Cosmo Royale uses the Gigantify Ray to make Phonepanzee grow. The Kodiak Zord's sonic howl weakens Phonepanzee's sonic boom which causes his line to be dead. The Rangers form the Ninja Steel Megazord and the Bull Rider Megazord. This monster was destroyed by the Ninja Steel Megazord and the Bull Rider Megazord.
 Cat O'Clock (voiced by Charlie McDermott) - A time-controlling Nekomata/stopwatch monster. After testing his remote control's abilities on Cosmo Royale, Galvanax has Cosmo Royale send Cat O'Clock down to Earth in a plot to freeze the Rangers in time and steal their Power Stars. During Redbot's book launch, Cat O'Clock and the Kudabots attack the truck containing "The Adventures of Redbot" books where Cat O'Clock uses his remote control to infect the books so that it will freeze anyone who touches the books. Upon attacking he book launch, Cat O'Clock freezes everyone who touched the book except for Redbot and Kodi. As Redbot gets the books out of the Rangers' hands, they help to fight Cat O'Clock while Levi and Redbot save a frozen Mary Masters before she is hit by a train. After Redbot saves Mary, the Rangers target Cat O'Clock to break Cat O'Clock's clock with their attacks. Brody and Hayley then use their final slashes to defeat Cat O'Clock. Thanks to a unanimous vote from the audience, Cosmo Royale uses the Gigantify Ray to make Cat O'Clock grow. The Rangers summon their Zords and the Rumble Tusk Zord's warrior mode. The Rangers form the Rumble Tusk Megazord to fight Cat O'Clock. This monster was destroyed by the Rumble Tusk Megazord. In "Past, Present, and Future," it is revealed that Cat O'Clock has a cousin named Cleocatra.
 Abrakadanger (voiced by Murray Keane) - A magic-using Ittan-momen/carpet monster. He wields a magic moon-shaped staff which he uses to cast his spells. Abrakadanger was introduced at "Galaxy Warriors" where he turns two Kudabots into balloons. He ambushes the Rangers at the time when Preston accidentally turned Hayley invisible with a magic spell from a spellbook associated with the Lion Galaxy. Abrakadanger's spells causes problems for the Rangers like throwing Levi across the country and turning Brody, Sarah, and Calvin into toys until an invisible Hayley helps Preston to get away from him. After Preston gets the spellbook's spells undone, the Ranger confront Abrakadanger and the Basher Bots at Oakhill Plaza and transform to fight them. Preston deflects Abrakadanger's spell that turns the Basher Bots into turtles. Brody and Preston defeat Abrakadanger with the Magic Dragon Super Slash Final Attack. Thanks to a unanimous vote from the audience, Cosmo Royale does his own magic trick that involves using the Gigantify Ray on Abrakadanger. The Ninja Steel Megazord Dragon Formation is formed to fight Abrakadanger in the sky until he turns it to stone. Levi arrives on the Robo Rider Zord to help where he uses the Robo Rider Zord's lasso to take Abrakadanger's staff. This monster was destroyed by the Bull Rider Megazord.
 Forcefear (voiced by Darren Young) - A Nurikabe/Grade crossing signals monster. He can form a brick wall-resembling force field and shoot lasers from his grade crossing signals parts. Forcefear appears on Galaxy Warriors where he tests his forcefield abilities by using his forcefield to deflect the Basher Bots' attacks back to Cosmo Royale. Arriving at the stadium, Forcefear and the Basher Bots fought the Rangers where the attacks by the Rangers don't seem to phase him even when he uses his forcefield to deflect the Rangers' attacks. After the Rangers fled, Madame Odius appeared as Forcefear suggested that the Gigantify Ray be used on him so that he can use his forcefield on Summer Cove. The audience even accepts that suggestion thanks to a unanimous vote as Cosmo Royale uses the Gigantify Ray on the Rangers as Forcefear calls out the Rangers to face him. Brody forms the Lion Fire Megazord while the other Rangers form the Ninja Steel Megazord and the Bull Rider Megazord help to hold him off while the Power Prism is making the new Power Star. When the Ninja Star is done, the Rangers combine the three Megazords to form the Ninja Ultrazord which breaks Forcefear's forcefield as Brody destroys Forcefear's weapons in a solo attack. This monster was destroyed by the Ninja Ultrazord.
 Cleocatra (voiced by Chelsea McEwan Millar) - A Mataneko/stopwatch monster who is Cat O'Clock's favorite cousin. Months following Galvanax's destruction, Cleocatra crashed the Ninja Steel Rangers' Christmas party where she froze everyone except for Sarah who grabs her time controller. When she runs into Santa Claus, Sarah accidentally sends herself and Santa Claus back in time. After traveling through time to convince the Rangers' past counterparts to let her borrow their Ninja Stars, Sarah and Santa Claus return to the present where the Rangers used the past Ninja Stars to transform and fight Cleocatra. After Brody accidentally uses the time controller to make himself grow, Cleocatra uses the same button to do the same thing. This monster was destroyed by the Lion Fire Flame Strike Final Attack, with assistance from the Robo Red Zord.
 Smellephant (voiced by Stephen Brunton) - An elephant-headed Baku/purse monster. He can freeze people with his eye beams and suck up anything with his nose. Smellephant accompanied Madame Odius and Badonna into finding the finding the Ninja Nexus Prism. While Madame Odius started making her evil Ninja Star with the help of a dark magic spell, the Rangers fight Smellephant and Badonna until the Rangers break the spell. Upon their Ninja Stars being restored, the Rangers transform and fight Smellephant. Brody assumes his Lion Fire form where the Rangers combine their attacks to take down Smellephant. Cosmo Royale then uses the Gigantify Ray to make Smellephant grow. This monster was destroyed by the Lion Fire Megazord.
 Deceptron (voiced by Mark Wright) - A flashlight/Frankenstein monster. His Bolt Blasters attack is fueled by every lie that is told. He is first seen feeding off of Monty's lie of liking Victor's blinding sunglasses. When he hears Calvin's lie to cover up his forgetting of Hayley's two year anniversary, Deceptron goes on the attack where his Bolt Blasters clogged up Hayley's Power Star. Deceptron then retreats to recharge his Bolt Buster. Deceptron tells Madame Odius and Cosmo Royale that he will feed off of Calvin's lies and clog all the Rangers' Power Stars. After hearing Calvin and Preston's lie while on the streets, Deceptron gets his Bolt Blasters and fights the Rangers where he deactivates Preston and Levi's Power Stars. When Sarah joins the fight upon Deceptron running out of lie energy, Deceptron gets away. After Calvin tells Hayley the truth, the bolts disappear as Deceptron returns upon feeding off of Monty's lies in the park. When the Rangers arrive, they morph and fight Deceptron alongside the Basher Bots. Upon assuming his Lion Fire form, Brody fights Deceptron as Calvin uses the Element Star to redirect the Bolt Blaster attack. The Rangers then combine their attacks to defeat Deceptron. Thanks to a unanimous vote from the audience, Cosmo Royale uses the Gigantify Ray to make Deceptron grow. The Rangers summon their Zords and form their respectful Megazords before forming the Ninja Ultrazord. This monster was destroyed by the Ninja Ultrazord.
 Spyclops (voiced by Teuila Blakely) - A Kasa-obake/fountain pen monster. She can fly and shoot a barrage of ink from her fountain pen-like parts. Madame Odius provides Spyclops with a symmetric spell from the Lion Galaxy disguised as a song in which if the Rangers sing it out loud, they will become evil. Assuming the form of a street performer named Jess (portrayed by Becky McEwan), she attracts the attention of Levi and plans to have him sing the song. When it comes to the performance at the park, Levi sings the entire spell as Spyclops sheds her disguise when she gets annoyed by Victor and Monty. The rest of the Rangers arrive as Levi is ordered to destroy the sheet music with the symmetric spell. While the rest of the Rangers fight Spyclops and Levi, Calvin works to gather the pieces of the sheet music. After Calvin gathers the pieces and has Preston read it backwards, Levi is freed from the spell as he helps to fight Spyclops. Upon Levi using the Storm Star's Tornado Mode, Brody uses the Red Tornado Star Final Attack to defeat Spyclops. Thanks to a unanimous vote from the audience, Cosmo Royale takes Spyclops to new heights by using the Gigantify Ray to make her grow. The Ninja Steel Megazord and the Bull Rider Megazord are formed to fight Spyclops. When the Rangers form the Astro Star Zord, they knock Spyclops out of the sky as the Ninja Fusion Zord is formed. This monster was destroyed by the Ninja Fusion Zord.
 Doomwave (voiced by Adrian Smith) - An Umibōzu/inflatable boat monster. He wields a naginata, can throw explosive dumbbells, and can specialize in fighting in the water. Doomwave has hidden a tsunami machine off the coast of Summer Cover which would disrupt the Summer Cove Big Catch competition. Due to Aaron Foster's diving drone having broken the tsunami machine, Madame Odius ordered Doomwave to fix it. Upon the Rangers identifying the metal caught on the diving drone to be the "Galaxy Warriors" logo, the Rangers return to the beach to investigate where they find Doomwave and the Basher Bots rebuilding the tsunami machine and fight him to prevent the repairs to the tsunami machine. Doomwave escapes into the ocean with the tsunami machine. After persuading Jackie Thompson and Aaron into repairing the diving drone in order to find the tsunami team, the Rangers use it to find the tsunami machine as Doomwave goes on the attack in an attempt to destroy it. After Brody and Levi use their attacks to defeat Doomwave, Sarah and Hayley destroy the tsunami machine. Thanks to a unanimous vote from the audience, Cosmo Royale makes Doomwave grow as Mick Kanic throws a Ninja Star that turns the diving drone into the Sub-Surfer Zord which assumes its Ninja Zord form to fight Doomwave, and they then form the Sub-Surfer Ninja Megazord. This monster was destroyed by the Sub-Surfer Megazord.
 Game Goblin (voiced by Jamie Linehan) - An Otoroshi/lawn mower monster. He can fire a Controller Beam to control anyone. Posing as a lizard-like video game character of the same name, Game Goblin gets to the kids in Summer Cove to be hooked on it so that he can suck them into the game once his meter is full. Once he has reached his meter, Game Goblin sucks the Rangers in except for Levi and Preston. Game Goblin then assumes his true form where he starts to "play with them". He starts getting stronger from everyone playing the game which enables him to use his Controller Beam to control Brody into fighting the others. Game Goblin does things to the other Rangers each time he powers down and powers up. After Levi finds out about Game Goblin's plot and gets Preston, Mick works with Levi to get everyone to stop playing the game while Preston goes into the game to help fight Game Goblin only to be hit by the Controller Beam. While Brody holds back Preston, the others fight Game Goblin. Thanks to a trick by Mick and Levi involving the "Game Goblin" curse, Game Goblin started to lose his powers as Preston regains control of himself. Preston then uses the Blue Tornado Spin Final Attack to defeat Game Goblin. Game Goblin then grows as part of the Bonus Level as the Rangers form the Ninja Steel Megazord Dragon Mode. After Game Goblin keeps using his Controller Beam, the Rangers form the Astro Ninja Steel Megazord and then forms the Sub-Surfer Ninja Megazord where it dodges the Control Beam. This monster was destroyed by the Sub-Surfer Megazord.
 Dreadwolf (voiced by Emmett Skilton) - He is a werewolf monster with kitchen knives for claws. His Werewolf Claw projectiles turn anyone he strikes with them into werewolves that obey his every command and can perform the Full Moon Energy Blast attack. Dreadwolf was first seen where he had turned Cosmo Royale into a werewolf and undid the transformation. Heading to Earth, Dreadwolf attacked the Rangers alongside the Basher Bots. When he tries to strike Levi with his Werewolf Claw, one of them hit Mick as he turned into a werewolf. At Redbot's suggestion, the Rangers remove the Werewolf Claw from Mick. At Metro Plaza, Dreadwolf mistook Levi's overzealous fan Chaz as Levi where he turned Victor and Chaz into werewolves. The Rangers arrive and Dreadwolf notices his mistake. As Levi deals with Chaz's werewolf form, the others pursue Dreadwolf who runs off to restock on his Werewolf Claws. When the Werewolf Claw is removed from Chaz thanks to a musical strategy, Levi catches up to the Rangers and has Brody throw the Lion Fire Armor to him as he assumes his Lion Fire Gold. Using the Double Flame Strike Final Attack, Levi defeats Dreadwolf. Thanks to a unanimous vote from the audience, Cosmo Royale uses the Gigantify Ray on Dreadwolf as the Ninja Ultrazord is formed. This monster was destroyed by the Ninja Ultrazord.
 Blammo (voiced by Tarun Mohanbhai) - He is a Konaki-jiji/barbell monster. Parts of his body can serve as bombs and he can also shoot eye beams. Blammo is a known demolition expert. After Blammo demonstrates his ability on "Galaxy Warriors," Sheriff Skyfire crashes the show to arrest Blammo for his illegal demolition activities much to the dismay of Cosmo Royale. After being tricked into arresting the Rangers, Sheriff Skyfire has Madame Odius hold Blammo until he returns. After Sheriff Skyfire learned that Madame Odius lied to her, Madame Odius sends Blammo down to place one of his bombs in the trashcan at the junkyard where the Rangers train. This bomb was placed in one of the recycling bins by security guard Clint. After the Rangers catch up to Clint and got the bomb destroyed with the Ninja Earth Attack, Blammo attacks as the Rangers and Sheriff Skyfire fight him. Sheriff Skyfire uses his Justice Strike to take down Blammo followed by Brody using the Lion Fire Justice Strike Final Attack to defeat Blammo. Thanks to a unanimous vote from the audience, Cosmo Royale uses the Gigantify Ray on Blammo as the Rangers form the Ninja Blaze Megazord to fight him. This monster was destroyed by the Ninja Blaze Megazord.
 Typeface (voiced by Andrew Faulkner) - He is a Mokumokuren/computer keyboard monster. He can shoot lasers from his eyes and travel through space with his space key. Typeface crashes Brody's training of a student named Emma at the docks. While Emma gets to safety, Brody transforms and fights Typeface. The rest of the Rangers show up as Typeface summons the Basher Bots for backup. Typeface retreats after being hit by Levi's Rock Storm Blast. Madame Odius states that Typeface was supposed to infect the Rangers' weapons with his computer virus and sends Badonna to make sure that Typeface succeeded. The two of them attack downtown and fight the Rangers alongside the Basher Bots. As Badonna retreats, the Rangers fight Typeface where Preston's blade is infected with the virus that soon affects the Rangers' network. With help from Emma, Redbot works to get rid of the computer virus while the Rangers fight Typeface without their weapons. Once the computer virus is deleted, the Rangers use their Ninja Blasters to attack Typeface and defeat him with the Ninja Blasts. Thanks to a unanimous vote from the audience, Cosmo Royale uses the Gigantify Ray to "reboot" Typeface as the Rangers form the Ninja Blaze Megazord. Typeface uses his Space Key to avoid being hit by the Ninja Blaze Megazord's attacks. This monster was destroyed by the Ninja Blaze Megazord, with assistance from the Astro Zord.
 Voltipede (voiced by Ashton Brown) - He is an energy-eating Ōmukade/power strip monster. Upon eating the electricity, he can perform electric attacks and even constrict with his centipede parts. Voltipede appears in the park where he drains power from a car and the electrical parts on Victor during his exercise with the side effect of charging him up. Then he proceeds to drain the energies from all the cars in Summer Cove. Calvin discovers that Voltipede is behind this and fights him. When the Rangers show up, Voltipede shoots down the Lion Fire Zord. After a brief fight with the Rangers, Voltipede retreats to find more energy. He arrives at the Summer Cove Power Plant where he starts draining its electricity. The Rangers arrive and fight a powered-up Voltipede who summons the Basher Bots to attack after shooting the Ninja Fusion Star from their hands. Trying out the Lion Fire Armor Star, Calvin uses the Lion Fire Flame Spin Final Attack to defeat Voltipede while General Tynamon claims the Ninja Fusion Star. Thanks to a unanimous vote from the audience, Cosmo Royale uses the Gigantify Ray to make Voltipede grow as the Rangers form the Ninja Blaze Megazord. Voltipede constricts with Ninja Blaze Megazord during a thunderstorm until he is attacked by the Lion Fire Zord. This monster was destroyed by the Ninja Blaze Megazord, with assistance from the Lion Fire Zord.
 Megamauler (voiced by Jeremy Birchall) - He is an Oboroguruma/skeleton monster. He uses a roller weapon when he is giant-sized. After having stolen the Ninja Fusion Star during the Rangers' fight with Voltipede, General Tynamon uses a spell to steal Levi's voice and combines the Ninja Fusion Star with six Skullgators unleashed by Cosmo Royale to form Megamauler in his giant form. The Rangers form the Ninja Steel Megazord to fight Megamauler only to be easily defeated. General Tynamon then shrinks Megamauler who flees after being scolded by General Tynamon. After Levi regains his voice with the help of Preston finding a spell to undo General Tynamon's spell, Megamauler and General Tynamon head out to 3rd Avenue to lure out the Rangers. The Rangers fight Megamauler and General Tynamon as Levi tests out his Super Star Mode. Using the Storm Star, Levi uses the Super Storm Star Slash to defeat Megamauler. Thanks to a unanimous vote from the audience following General Tynamon's retreat, the Rangers summon the Ninja Blaze Megazord to fight Megamauler where they block the roller weapon. The Rangers form the Ninja Blaze Ultrazord and use the Blaze Ultra Blitz to destroy the roller weapon. This monster was destroyed by the Ninja Blaze Ultrazord.
 Gorrox (voiced by Jay Simon) - He is a bull-horned Shuten-dōji/Nobori monster who is friends with Brax. He wields a kanabō in battle. Gorrox first appeared in the form of a TV producer (portrayed by Michael Saccente) to audition for a TV project that is actually part of Madame Odius's brainwashing plot. Victor and Monty win the audition through dumb luck and are teleported to the Warrior Dome ship as Gorrox sheds his disguise. The Rangers witness this and fight Gorrox. Brody assumed his Lion Fire Red to duel Gorrox. Using the Lion Fire Flame Strike Final Attack, Brody defeats Gorrox who survived as Brax joins the battle. Thanks to the unanimous vote from the audience, Cosmo Royale uses the Gigantify Ray to make Gorrox and Brax grow. The Rangers form the Ninja Steel Megazord and the Ninja Blaze Megazord to fight them in a two-on-two battle. Gorrox faces off against the Ninja Steel Megazord while Brax fights the Ninja Blaze Megazord. This monster was destroyed by the Ninja Ultrazord. Gorrox is the final Galaxy Warriors Contestant in Power Rangers Super Ninja Steel, and overall, the final Galaxy Warriors Contestant in the Power Rangers Ninja Steel series.

Gruesome Grunts
The Gruesome Grunts are a group of monsters who have no connections to Madame Odius and have committed crimes throughout the galaxy. They switched bodies with the Rangers so that they can fool the Mummy Guards in orders to bring them before the Halloween Intergalactic Court. When four of the body-swapped Rangers were captured, they had to prove themselves that the Gruesome Grunts stole their body. If their meter hits the top, the body-swapped Rangers will be destroyed. Thanks to a plan by Mick, they trap Versix and lure the Mummy Guards to apprehending them. Mick posed as Versix to confess as the Court Witch undoes the spell. Versix's teammates were destroyed by the Jack-o'-lantern Judges while Versix was destroyed by the Rangers.

 Versix (voiced by Jay Simon) - A magic-using Binbōgami/Christmas stocking monster who is the leader of the Gruesome Grunts. He can swap the bodies of anyone and shoot a beam from his wand. After he was trapped in the garbage can, Mick posed as Versix to get a confession which led to his teammates being vaporized by the Jack-o'-lantern Judges. After Versix escaped, the Rangers fought Versix at the docks. Using the Lion Fire Armor Star, Brody uses the Lion Fire Flame Strike and the Lion Fire Double Strike to defeat Versix. Surviving the attack, Versix then casts a spell to make himself grow as the Ninja Ultrazord is formed. Versix shook the Earth to split the Ninja Ultrazord as the Rangers summon the Auxiliary Zords to help fight Versix. Versix was destroyed by the Super Zord Slashes Final Attack.
 Fangore (voiced by Stephen Brunton impersonating Cheech Marin) - A syringe sword-wielding Count Dracula-themed monster. Fangore is a member of the Gruesome Grunt and has a weakness to garlic. Fangore in Calvin's body stated that Fangore tried to turn the Rangers into vampires and was defeated by their vampire attack. Once the body-swap spell was undone, Fangore was destroyed by the Jack-o'-lantern Judges.
 Stabberous (voiced by Emmett Skilton impersonating Gilbert Gottfried) - An Amikiri/Swiss Army knife monster. Stabberous in Preston's body stated that Stabberous was cutting up everything before defeating them with a Ninja Metal Attack. Once the body-swap spell was undone, Sabberous was destroyed by the Jack-o'-lantern Judges.
 Jabberon (voiced by Daisy Lawless) - A Futakuchi-onna/glasses monster. She switched bodies with Hayley. Once the body-swap spell was undone, Jabberon was destroyed by the Jack-o'-lantern Judges.
 Shelldax (voiced by Jeremy Birchall) - A basilisk/Black Tortoise monster. He switched bodies with Levi. Once the body-swap spell was undone, Shelldax was destroyed by the Jack-o'-lantern Judges.
 Plasmora (voiced by Lauren Jackson) - A female vampire monster. She switched bodies with Sarah. Once the body-swap spell was undone, Plasmora was destroyed by the Jack-o'-lantern Judges.
 Ackshun (voiced by Gareth Williams) - A cinematic props monster. He switch places with Brody. Once the body-swap spell was undone, Ackshun was destroyed by the Jack-o'-lantern Judges.

Sledge's Outlaws
These are the outlaws in Sledge's possession that appear in this show:

 Snow Fright (voiced by Sarah Hart) - A Yuki-onna/Kakigōri maker monster. She can perform ice attacks that can trap people in snowmen. Snow Fright accompanies Sledge to capture the Ninja Steel Rangers. While Sledge and Preston fled through a portal, Snow Fright brought the others to the rebuilt Warrior Dome to be on "The Poisy Show". When Koda and Santa Claus arrive to help, Snow Fright heads to Earth with the Basher Bots, where they fight the Rangers. Brody becomes Lion Fire Red and uses the Lion Fire Heat Wave Final Attack to defeat Snow Fright. Sledge and Wrench use the Gigantify Ray to make Snow Fright grow as the Rangers form their respective Megazords as Snow Fright causes a cold snap. The Rangers form the Ninja Ultrazord within the snowman and fight back against Snow Fright. This monster was destroyed by the Ninja Ultrazord.

In addition, two unnamed outlaws in Sledge's possession helped Sledge to rebuild the Warrior Dome ship for Madame Odius before Koda's bomb killed them.

 Shuriken Sentai Ninninger''' monster Yokai Burburu.
 A Kuliner from Ressha Sentai ToQger''.

Notes

References

External links
 Official Power Rangers Website

Power Rangers
Ninja Steel